Woodland Hills may refer to:

Places in the United States
 Woodland Hills, Cleveland, a neighborhood in Cleveland, Ohio
 Woodland Hills, Los Angeles, a neighborhood in Los Angeles, California
 Woodland Hills, a neighborhood in Atlanta, Georgia
 Woodland Hills, a neighborhood in North Druid Hills, Georgia
 Woodland Hills, Kentucky, a city in Jefferson County
 Woodland Hills, Utah, a city in Utah County

Other uses
Woodland Hills School District, a school district in Pittsburgh, Pennsylvania
Woodland Hills Mall, a large shopping mall in Tulsa, Oklahoma